Kadampuzha Devi Temple is a Hindu temple and pilgrimage center at Kadampuzha in Malappuram district, Kerala, India. The main deity of this temple is Goddess Parvati/Durga in the form of a huntress. There is no idol of Goddess in this temple, and she is worshipped in a pit. The presence of Lord Ganesha is also believed to be with the Goddess, and there are sub-shrines for Lord Sastha and serpent deities. A separate Shiva temple exists near the temple, called 'Madambiyarkavu'. Both these temples are under the control of Malabar Devaswom Board.

Offerings 
The importance of performing Vazhivadus in this temple is that the devotees are facilitated to witness the Vazhivadu performance by posing at the door step of the Sreekovil which is closer to the idol as there is no Sopanam in front of the Sreekovil.

The most important Vazhivadus here are the Poomoodal and Muttarukkal. Devotees can book the offering through the official online website : https://www.kadampuzhadevaswom.in/

Various other Vazhivadus can also be performed, the details of which are provided elsewhere.

Timings 

 Darsana timings will be   :  04.30 AM to 12.00 Noon. >> 03.30 PM to 07.00 PM
 Vazhipadu Counters Timings :  05.00 AM to 11.00 AM. >> 03.30 PM to 05.00 PM

Festivals 
Thanthrik Festivals (Poushtika Karmas)

Rigveda Laksharchana

In the month of Dhanu, Rigveda Laksharchana, under the auspices of thanthri and attended by great vedic scholars, is performed for 8 days. The Rigveda Archana commences in the early hours every day and Abhisheka will be performed in the evening.

Cultural programs will be held during the first 7 days staging temple arts and art forms, well attended by large audiences and many dignitaries.

Dravya Kalasam

Dravya Kalasam in the month of Thulam is conducted with its thanthrik and ritualistic varieties for 8 days under the auspices of Temple Thanthri. The Dravya Kalasam will commence with Aacharyavaranam, Mulayidal, Praasdasudhi, Rakshoknahoma, Asthrakalasa, Vaasthukalasa, Dhara, Sudhi, Homas, Thatwahoma, and finally concludes with Brahmakalasa Abhisekha accompanied by Valiyapani and Melavadhyams etc.

Murajapam:There will be one day’s special thanthri pooja every month followed with Murajapa by great vedic scholars.

See also 
 Kadampuzha Temple Malayalam Wiki
 Temples of Kerala

External links 

other Vazhivadus can also be performed, the details of which are provided elsewhere.
Official Website Of Kadampuzha Devi Temple

Hindu pilgrimage sites in India
Hindu temples in Malappuram district
Tourist attractions in Malappuram district
Devi temples in Kerala